JAML or Junctional Adhesion Molecule-Like, or AMICA1 is a JAM transmembrane protein family member.  It is composed of two extracellular immunoglobulin-like domains, a membrane-spanning region, and a cytoplasmic tail involved in activation signaling.   A known ligand of JAML is Coxsackie virus and Adenovirus Receptor (CXADR in humans and CAR in mice) which has been shown to localize to the tight junctions of epithelial cells.

JAML-mediated activation of CAR is required for neutrophil extravasation in addition to other leukocyte/epithelial cell interaction models.

Other members of the JAM family of transmembrane proteins include JAM1, JAM2 and JAM3.

References

Further reading

Transmembrane proteins